Shihu Township is a township in Donghai County, Jiangsu, China. , it administers the following eleven villages:
Shihu Village
Dalou Village
Liaotang Village
Chizhuang Village
Qiaotuan Village
Youzhuang Village
Tuanchi Village
Hezhuang Village
Shuiku Village
Huangtang Village
Youtang Village

References 

Township-level divisions of Jiangsu
Donghai County